Devil, My Friend is a 1988 Turkish comedy film directed by Atıf Yılmaz.

Cast 
 Mazhar Alanson - Fatih
 Ali Poyrazoğlu - The Devil
 Yaprak Özdemiroğlu
 Özkan Uğur
 
 Bülent Kayabaş

References

External links 

1988 comedy films
1988 films
Turkish fantasy comedy films